Parsua (earlier Parsuash, Parsumash) was an ancient tribal kingdom/chiefdom  (860-600 BC) located between Zamua (formerly: Lullubi) and Ellipi, in central Zagros to the southwest of Sanandaj, western Iran. The name Parsua is from an old Iranian word Parsava and it is presumed to mean border or borderland.

Parsua was distinct from Persis, another region to the southeast, now known as Fars province in Iran. Some accounts suggest that Teispes, the ancestor of the Achaemenid dynasty, led a migration from Parsua to Persis, formerly the Elamite state of Anshan.

References

Former countries in the Middle East
Ancient history of Iran